Teracotona translucens is a moth in the family Erebidae. It was described by Karl Grünberg in 1907. It is found in the Democratic Republic of the Congo, Malawi, Rwanda, Tanzania and Uganda.

References

Moths described in 1907
Spilosomina